Apostolic Generation Church (or Gereja Generasi Apostolik) is a non-denominational church located in Jakarta, Indonesia

As of March 2007, it has more than 1,800 weekly attendees during its English and Indonesian language services.

Leadership

Apostle Indri Gautama—as the church founder—is the senior pastor of Apostolic Generation Church. The church currently has 10 pastors with their unique area of ministries.

Indri Gautama founded the church without the name of AGC in 2002 with seven people. The church opened officially on the 3rd of April on the next year with the name Apostolic Generation Church, after Gautama met Naomi Dowdy, an American missionary living in Singapore.

Services
Apostolic Generation Church currently has Saturday and Sunday services. The duration of each service is approximately 2–3 hours long.

Location
Since December 2009, the services have moved to The Kuningan Place which located at Jalan Kuningan Utama Lot 15, Jakarta, 12980
The Kuningan Place Location

See also
Indri Gautama
Christianity in Indonesia
Religion in Indonesia

References

External links
 Maria Magdalena Ministry official homepage

Churches in Jakarta
Christian organizations established in 2002
2002 establishments in Indonesia